The Korovin pistol (Пистолет Коровина, Тульский Коровин (ТК), GAU Index 56-A-112) is regarded as the first Soviet semi-automatic pistol.

History
Sergey Korovin designed the first 7.65 mm caliber military pistol around 1922, while working at the famous Tula arms factory TOZ. However, this model proved too complex and difficult. But in 1925 the sport society Dinamo placed an order for a 6.35 mm pocket pistol for sports and civic needs. By 1926, Korovin completed development of a model, and at the end of that year, TOZ began its release.

The following year the gun was approved for use, having received the official title of «Pistol TK Model 1926». The gun was not intended for the army, and it was considered a "civilian weapon". It was used by NKVD operatives, militsiya, senior officers of the Red Army and senior government or party officials. TKs were often used as gifts or awards.

Some TK pistols remained in Sberkassa offices even after the end of the Great Patriotic War.

Construction 
The pistol is of simple blowback type. A safety is located on the left side of the frame above the trigger; the magazine catch is located at the bottom of the grip.

The grip panels came in two types: plastic with the TOZ logo, or wooden. Wooden grips came in two versions: checkered or with larger vertical grooves. Until the early 1930s grips were secured with screws, later with spring latches.

Ammo
The Korovin was developed for the .25 ACP cartridge of J.M.Browning design.
The official designation of the cartridge in Soviet Russia were: 6.35-mm pistol cartridge 57-N-112 (Browning) - 6,35-мм пистолетный патрон 57-Н-112 (Браунинга), where 57-Н-112 - ГАУ/GAU index for product. Some Russian sources mention the use of a more powerful cartridge in the gun, which is copied a mistake. According to GAU documents the standard only Browning 6,35 mm cartridges produced in the USSR, since 1934, when the TK pistol production was already ended.

See also
List of Russian weaponry

Notes

External links

Russian revolvers site
History pistols site

Semi-automatic pistols of the Soviet Union
.25 ACP semi-automatic pistols
World War II infantry weapons of the Soviet Union
Tula Arms Plant products
Military equipment introduced in the 1920s